"Think It Over" is a rock-and-roll song written by Buddy Holly, Jerry Allison, and Norman Petty in 1958, originally recorded by the Crickets.  Vi Petty, Norman Petty's wife, played piano on this recording.

Chart performance
In the US, "Think It Over" was released by Brunswick Records as a 45-rpm single (9-55072), reached number 27 on the Billboard pop singles chart, and number 9 on the Billboard R&B chart.  Overseas, the song went to number 11 in the UK.

Other recordings
The song has been recorded by:
Bobby Vee
The Bobby Fuller Four
The Hollies
Skeeter Davis
Gloria Lynne
P.J. Proby
Ringo Starr.
Australian band Ol' 55 covered the song on their album, Take It Greasy (1976).

References

Sources
Amburn, Ellis (1996). Buddy Holly: A Biography. St. Martin's Press. .
Bustard, Anne (2005). Buddy: The Story of Buddy Holly. Simon & Schuster. .
Dawson, Jim; Leigh, Spencer (1996). Memories of Buddy Holly. Big Nickel Publications. .
Gerron, Peggy Sue (2008). Whatever Happened to Peggy Sue? Togi Entertainment. .
Goldrosen, John (1975). Buddy Holly: His Life and Music. Popular Press. .
Goldrosen, John; Beecher, John (1996). Remembering Buddy: The Definitive Biography. New York: Da Capo Press. .
Gribbin, John (2009). Not Fade Away: The Life and Music of Buddy Holly. London: Icon Books. .

1958 songs
1958 singles
Buddy Holly songs
Songs written by Buddy Holly
Songs written by Norman Petty
Brunswick Records singles
Songs written by Jerry Allison
The Crickets songs